Abzhywa ( - "middle people" – Абжьыуа, Abƶywa; also transliterates as Abzhua from Russian: Абжуа, Абжива) is one of the seven historical regions  in Abkhazia, and accordingly one of the seven stars on Flag of Abkhazia represents Abzhywa.

Territory 
Prior to the Russian annexation of the Principality of Abkhazia,  Abzhywa constituted its separate administrative district. Later, in the Russian Empire Abzhywa constituted an okrug of Abkhazia.
It occupied most of the territory of modern Ochamchire, as well as part of the territory of the Tkvarcheli District of Abkhazia, between the Kodor and Okhurei rivers.

History 
Abzhywa got its name from its middle location among the rest of the historical regions of Abkhazia. Some scholars argue that it was part of the principality of Apsilae in the ancient period. During the period of Russian rule in Abkhazia up to 1866, Abzhua was called "Abzhuiskiy district", in 1868-1883 - "Kodori district", in 1919-1930 - "Kodori district". Since 1930, Abzhua officially became known as the Ochamchira region (later - Ochamchire Municipality).
The territory appears as part of  Abkhazian principality from the first half of the XVIII century. It was created after the Abkhazian principality annexed the northwestern part of the Samegrelo principality. The first governor of Abzhua was the son of the Abkhazian prince  — , who inherited the middle part of the principality from his father's inheritance, hence the etymology of the toponym.

Literature 
Maan O. V.  Abzhua. Historical and ethnological sketches of the Ochamchira region of Abkhazia.  Sukhum, 2006

References 

Regions of Abkhazia
Subdivisions of Abkhazia